Arytropteris pondo, the Pondo flat-necked shieldback, is a species of shield-backed katydid. The species is endemic to South Africa.

References

Tettigoniinae
Insects described in 1988